The Bosnia and Herzegovina women's national under-18 and under 19 basketball team is the national representative for Bosnia and Herzegovina in international under-18 and under-19 women's basketball competitions. They are organized and run by the Basketball Federation of Bosnia and Herzegovina.

The team competes at the FIBA U18 Women's European Championship, with the opportunity to qualify for the FIBA Under-19 Women's World Cup.

FIBA U18 Women's European Championship

See also
Bosnia and Herzegovina women's national basketball team
Bosnia and Herzegovina women's national under-20 basketball team
Bosnia and Herzegovina women's national under-16 and under-17 basketball team

References

External links
Official website (in Bosnian)
FIBA profile

under
Women's national under-18 basketball teams
Women's national under-19 basketball teams